Geoplin is a natural gas company in Slovenia. The biggest shareholder of the company is Petrol d.d. Ljubljana.

About the company
Geoplin is Slovenia’s largest natural gas trader and one of the most important companies in the Slovenian energy sector, with many years of tradition. Its aim is to remain the leader and continue developing. Geoplin trades and acts as an agent and intermediary on the natural gas market in Slovenia and neighbouring countries.

References
www.geoplin.si

External links

 Company website

Oil and gas companies of Slovenia